FNF or FnF may refer to:

Arts, entertainment, and media
FnF (TV series), a Bangladeshi drama
 "F.N.F. (Let's Go)", a 2022 song by Hitkidd and GloRilla
 Friday Night Fights, an American boxing television series
 Friday Night Funkin', a 2020 rhythm-based video game
 Frisco Jones and Felicia Cummings, a fictional couple on the television series General Hospital, also known as FnF

Businesses and organizations
 Families Need Fathers, a British charity organization
 Federação Norte-rio-grandense de Futebol, the Football Association of Rio Grande do Norte, Brazil
 Fidelity National Financial, an American mortgage provider
 Florence Nightingale Foundation, a British nursing organization
 Foreningene Nordens Forbund, a Scandinavian organization
 Friedrich Naumann Foundation, a German political foundation
 National Front for the Family (Frente Nacional por la Familia), a Mexican coalition of over 1000 organizations

Other uses
 Fault not found, a term used in the field of maintenance
 Friday Night Football (disambiguation)
 North Fremantle railway station, in Australia